The Polonaise in C-sharp minor, Op. 26 No. 1 and the Polonaise in E-flat minor, Op. 26 No. 2 were composed by Frédéric Chopin in 1836. Both of them were dedicated to Josef Dessauer. These were his first published polonaises.

Op. 26 No. 1 in C-sharp minor
The Polonaise opens with a fiery Allegro appassionato in C-sharp minor, the primary theme preceded by descending octaves. The section climaxes with a series of virtuosic arpeggio figures which give way to a tender melody. This is then followed by a repetition of the theme. After this opening section, there is a new theme introduced in the enharmonic D-flat major. This new theme is then developed and followed by a new left hand melody, which increases the tension until a repeat of the meno mosso. The piece ends in abrupt quietness.

Op. 26 No. 2 in E-flat minor
The Polonaise opens ominously but soon builds to become more agitated and passionate. The middle of the piece is a contrast to the dark atmosphere of the piece. Following the return of the main theme, the piece closes with subtlety, like its opus companion.

References

External links
 

Polonaises by Frédéric Chopin
1836 compositions
Compositions in C-sharp minor
Compositions in E-flat minor
Polonaises